Heartwork may refer to:
Heartwork, an album by Carcass
Heartwork: Symphony of Destruction, a hentai anime by Active Software
Heartwork (EP), an EP by Butch Walker